Prayer During the Day is a liturgy of the Church of England from the service book Common Worship. Along with Night Prayer (or "Compline"), it is a daily prayer service to supplement Morning Prayer and Evening Prayer. The Church of England's publication Common Worship Daily Prayer contains this shorter form of Prayer for each day of the week, as well as the longer forms of Morning and Evening Prayer. The Church of England's own literature outlines several different methods for its use, one of which suggests that it is equivalent to the monastic offices of Terce, Sext, and None.  It may be used for a daily quiet time of reading, prayer and reflection.

Anglican liturgy

Anglican liturgical books